John Mandeville (1655 – 21 January 1725) was a Canon of Windsor from 1709 to 1722 and Dean of Peterborough from 1722 to 1725

Career
He was educated at Worksop College and St John’s College, Cambridge, where he graduated BA 1673, MA 1677 and DD in 1694.

He was appointed as:
Rector of Dry Drayton, Cambridge 1690–1691
Chaplain to the King and Queen 1690–1725
Rector of St Mary Magdalene, Old Fish Street 1691–1713
Prebendary of Lincoln 1695
Chancellor of Lincoln 1695–1713
Archdeacon of Lincoln 1709–1725
Dean of Peterborough 1722–1725
Prebendary of Westminster 1722–1725

He was appointed to the eighth stall in St George's Chapel, Windsor Castle in 1709, and held the stall until 1722.

Notes 

1655 births
1725 deaths
Alumni of St John's College, Cambridge
Canons of Windsor
Archdeacons of Lincoln
Deans of Peterborough
Canons of Westminster